Strebors Black Magic On Demand, better known as Magic, is a female miniature horse working as a therapy horse inside hospitals and hospice programs. She was named one of History's Ten Most Heroic Animals by Time magazine. Magic was also selected The Most Heroic Pet in America by the AARP and included in Newsweek/The Daily Beast's Most Heroic Animals of 2010. Magic is a Reader's Digest  AmericanTowns Power Of One Hero.

References

2006 animal births
Animal-assisted therapy
Individual mares
Individual animals in the United States
Miniature horses